Amzacea is a commune in Constanța County, Northern Dobruja, Romania. It includes three villages:
 Amzacea (historical names: Amuza-aci, Amzaça)
 Casicea (historical name: Maior Chiriacescu)
 General Scărișoreanu (historical names:  Enghez) - named after the Romanian World War I General . Scărișoreanu received the promotion from Colonel to Brigadier General  on the battlefield after the fierce defense of the Topraisar-Amzacea sector of the front by his division during the Second Battle of Cobadin.

Demographics
At the 2011 census, Amzacea had 2,231 Romanians (85.58%), 239 Turks (9.17%), 128 Tatars (4.91%), 4 Lipovans (0.15%), 5 others (0.19%).

References

External links
  Amzacea on the website of the Constanţa County Council
  Population, Amzacea official site

Communes in Constanța County
Localities in Northern Dobruja
Place names of Turkish origin in Romania